Luphai Secondary School is a school in Maranzhe village in Limpopo, South Africa. It is about 20 km north west of Thohoyandou; the school is named after Chief Luphai Nemaranzhe of Maranzhe.

References

Schools in Limpopo
High schools in South Africa